The Salamandre Lake is a freshwater body of the municipality of Eeyou Istchee Baie-James (municipality), in the administrative region of Nord-du-Québec, at Quebec, in Canada. The northern part of the lake is crossed to the West by the Broadback River.

Forestry is the main economic activity of the sector. Recreational tourism activities come second with an upstream navigable waterbody including the Broadback River and the Nipukatasi River.

The southern part of the Salamandre Lake hydrographic slope is accessible via a forest road (east–west) coming from the west and connecting the main road going north. The surface of Salamandre Lake is usually frozen from early November to mid-May; however, safe ice circulation is generally from mid-November to mid-April.

Geography 
The Salamandre Lake is part of a group of lakes in the same area, which are formed in length, more or less parallel to each other, on the east side of which Quénonisca Lake, the Rocher Lake crossed by the Nipukatasi River and Amisquioumisca Lake (east side). While on the west side, the major body of water is Evans Lake.

The Salamandre Lake is mainly fed by forest streams. The areas around the lake have a generally leveled topography.

The mouth of Salamandre Lake is located at:
 south of the mouth of the Salamandre River (confluence with the Broadback River);
 south-east of the mouth of Evans Lake which is crossed by the Broadback River;
 east of the mouth of the Broadback River;
 north-east of downtown Matagami;
 west of downtown Chibougamau.

Geology

This convert was originally described as the "Rock-Kenonisca Massif" by Franconi (1974) in his report on the mapping of the western half of the Frotet-Evans volcano-sedimentary band. It was renamed "Rocher-Salamander Intrusive Suite" by Brisson  et al.  (1998) when mapping the Lake Rocher area (NTS sheet 32K09). The addition of Whitefish Intrusion (nAwf) and Rock Intrusion (nAlrc) as lithodemes in the Intrusive Suite of Rocher-Salamandre is proposed following the fieldwork and compilation of Leclerc and Caron-Côté (2017).

Toponymy
In the past, this body of water was designated "Big Whitefis Lake" or the French version "Lac Poisson Blanc".

The toponym lac Salamandre was formalized on December 5, 1968 at the Commission de toponymie du Québec, at the creation of this commission.

Notes and references

See also 

Eeyou Istchee James Bay
Broadback River drainage basin
Salamander
Jamésie